Sookie, also written ‘Sukey’ or ‘Suki’, is a variant of the name Susan or Susannah, from Hebrew  meaning "rose" or "lily." Most famously, the name occurs in the English nursery rhyme "Polly Put the Kettle On."

Sookie may refer to the following fictional characters:
 Sookie St. James, from the TV series Gilmore Girls
 Sookie Stackhouse, appearing in The Southern Vampire Mysteries novels and the True Blood TV adaptation
 Sookie Saperstein, a character in Igby Goes Down

See also 
 Suki (disambiguation)
 Sukie (disambiguation)

References